Harpan Khola (river) is a tributary of Phewa Lake in Pokhara.

References 

Rivers of Gandaki Province